Olathe East High School is a public high school located in Olathe, Kansas, United States, serving students in grades 9-12. The school is one of five high schools in the Olathe USD 233 school district. Olathe East is a member of the Kansas State High School Activities Association and offers a variety of sports programs.  Athletic teams compete in the 6A division and are known as the "Hawks". Extracurricular activities are also offered in the form of performing arts, school publications, and clubs.  The school colors are orange and navy blue, and the school's mascot is the Hawk.  Olathe East was recognized as a National School of Excellence in 1998 by the U.S. Department of Education.

History
The school opened in the fall of 1992 in order to help educate the rapidly increasing population of Olathe.

On March 4, 2022, there was a school shooting on campus by a student. A school resource officer and an administrator were injured, as was the shooter. No other faculty members or students were harmed in the shooting. The suspect was put in custody by the police.

Academics

In 1997, Olathe East High School was selected as a Blue Ribbon School. The Blue Ribbon Award recognizes public and private schools which perform at high levels or have made significant academic improvements.

Olathe East has continuously had the highest composite standardized test scores in the district. In the 2006–2007 school year, East had a composite ACT score of 23.8, beating the national average of 21.2. On the SAT, the average score was a 604 on the Critical Reading section and a 614 on the Math section. These scores were also much higher than the national average of 503 on the Critical Reading and 518 on the Mathematics section. Olathe East also offers a variety of high level AP and Honors courses including AP English, AP American History, AP Government, AP Chemistry, AP Biology, AP Statistics, College Physics, and Honors Calculus.

Extracurricular activities
The Hawks compete in the Sunflower League and are classified as a 6A school, the largest classification in Kansas according to the Kansas State High School Activities Association. Throughout its history, Olathe East has won 50 state championships in various sports. Many graduates have gone on to participate in collegiate athletics.

Athletics

Soccer
One of the most popular athletic programs offered at Olathe East is soccer. Throughout the school's history, the boys' team has won four state championships, occurring in 1996, 2005, 2014, and 2018, and the girls' team has won four state championships, occurring in 2001, 2004, 2008, and 2012.

Boys' Swimming & Diving
The Olathe East boys' swimming & diving team won the state championship in 2009 after placing second to Shawnee Mission East High School in 2007 and 2008. In 2008, there was a one-point difference between Shawnee Mission East and Olathe East.

Softball
The Hawks have consistently been one of the best softball teams in Kansas, winning state championships in 1998, 2001, 2004, 2005, 2006, 2007, 2012, and 2013. In 2007, the Hawks set a new KSHSAA record for most consecutive state championships won in softball.

Track and Field
The Olathe East track and field team has won 10 state championships since 2007 and 11 overall, including five for boys in 1998, 2007, 2010, 2014, and 2015 and five consecutive state championships for girls from 2008 to 2012.

State Championships

Performing arts
The Olathe East Orchestra has performed at the KMEA music festival several times and performed at Carnegie Hall in January 2007, and has received three straight "I" ratings for the second consecutive year. The Olathe East Band has also received many accomplishments such as receiving all "I" ratings at the area music festival in March 2007. The band performed at Avery Fisher Hall in New York City in spring 2009. In fall of 2010, the band had its first undefeated season in the school's history. The band took first place in the 6A division at KU's Heart Of American Marching Festival, and first in their division at Missouri Western's marching competition. The OE Choir has sent several students to Northeast KMEA All-District Music Festival along with all the other performing groups at East. Olathe East's drama department has also been very successful, winning various awards and has performed at both the International Thespian Conference and Kansas State Thespian Conference.

Technology
The school now has wi-fi access located all throughout the campus. All classrooms at OE are equipped with multipurpose projectors which allows teachers to project movies and images from their computer. Classrooms are equipped with Smartboard technology. Many teachers take advantage of software called Blackboard which allows students to access assignments from any computer including computers outside of the school network. The Science and Mathematics departments each have classroom sets of laptops. In addition, Olathe East has several computer labs for added integration of technology into the high school curriculum.

Notable alumni
 Matt Bingesser, Kansas Representative for District 15
 Stevie Case, professional video game player
 Dawson Gurley, also known as Big Daws, is a YouTube personality
 Tyler Kalinoski, professional basketball player
 Danielle McCray, WNBA player for the Connecticut Sun, former player for the Kansas Jayhawks women's basketball team
 Dan Ryckert, former video game journalist
 Scott Vermillion, professional soccer player, 1994 Kansas High School Male Athlete of the Year
 Haley Hanson, NWSL player for the Orlando Pride

See also
 List of high schools in Kansas
 List of unified school districts in Kansas
Other high schools in Olathe USD 233 school district
 Olathe North High School in Olathe
 Olathe Northwest High School in Olathe
 Olathe South High School in Olathe
 Olathe West High School in Olathe

References

External links
 
 Olathe USD 233 School District

Public high schools in Kansas
Education in Olathe, Kansas
Educational institutions established in 1992
1992 establishments in Kansas
Schools in Johnson County, Kansas
Buildings and structures in Olathe, Kansas